Manfred Burghartswieser (born 23 August 1973) is a German former professional footballer who played as a midfielder.

References

External links

1973 births
Living people
German footballers
Association football midfielders
Germany youth international footballers
Germany under-21 international footballers
FC Bayern Munich II players
TSV 1860 Munich II players
FC Augsburg players
SV Wacker Burghausen players
TSV 1860 Rosenheim players
German football managers
2. Bundesliga players
People from Burghausen, Altötting
Sportspeople from Upper Bavaria
Footballers from Bavaria